SeAZ was a large engineering plant in Serpukhov, Moscow Oblast, Russia. From 1939 to 1995, the company was called SMZ (Serpukhov Motorcycle Plant) and produced various cyclecars for use by disabled drivers, usually powered by IZh motorcycle engines. Between 1991 and 2008 it also produced Lada Oka microcars developed by AvtoVAZ. The company was declared bankrupt in 2013.

History
The company was founded on July 7, 1939, by an order of the People's Commissariat for General Automotive Industry and by the head of Glavmotoveloprom, concerning production of small-capacity motorcycles.

Since the beginning of the 1980s, the factory entered a period of development: the prototype of a new car was designed and produced, and was named "Oka". It anticipated the car produced nowadays.

In 1985, the Council of Ministers of the Soviet Union issued a decree "On the creation of new capacities for the production of the new model of a microcar at the AvtoVAZ and KamAZ plants and at the Serpukhov Motorcycle Plant of the Soviet Ministry of the Automotive Industry".

The Serpukhov plant was significantly rebuilt for the new tasks. The leading Soviet enterprises, as well as some foreign companies such as Dürr AG, Bollhoff and PPG, were entrusted with the equipment for production and assembly. In 1989, the plant started assembling cars of the extra-small class. At the same time, it was integrated into the AvtoVAZ corporation.

In 1995, AvtoVAZ fully transferred the assembly of the Oka microcar to SMZ. In 2005, the SeAZ stock company became a member of the Avtokom industrial group. Production of the Oka ended in 2007. The company has subsequently stated that it has no plans to resume car production.

After the company's bankruptcy, the factory site was turned into the Serpukhov Industrial Park.

Welfare cars

References

External links

 Serpukhov Automobile Plant

Defunct motor vehicle manufacturers of Russia
Motor vehicle manufacturers of the Soviet Union
Companies based in Moscow
Vehicle manufacturing companies established in 1939
Russian brands
Soviet brands
1939 establishments in the Soviet Union